The Panama Canal Department was a department (geographical command) of the United States Army, responsible for the defense of the Panama Canal Zone between 1917 and 1947.

First U.S. Army presence

The Isthmian Canal Commission and the Panama Canal Guard of 1904–1914 both played a pivotal role in the construction and early defense of the Canal. With the active support and encouragement of the United States, Panama declared its independence from Colombia on 3 Nov. 1903 and that same month, the United States received the right to build and administer the Panama Canal.

On 8 Mar. 1904, President Theodore Roosevelt appointed an Isthmian Canal Commission (ICC), composed primarily of Army officers, to govern the Canal Zone and to report directly to the Secretary of War.

In 1907, President Roosevelt appointed Army Lt. Col. George W. Goethals to the post of Chief Engineer of the ICC, officially turning construction of the Canal into a military project. To more adequately protect the Canal from external threats, the Army conducted an on-site survey in 1910 and began building defensive fortifications in 1911—to include Fort De Lesseps, Fort Randolph, and Fort Sherman on the Atlantic side, and Fort Amador and Grant on the Pacific side. On 4 Oct. 1911, a regiment of the U.S. Army 10th Infantry arrived at Camp E.S. Otis, on the Pacific side of the isthmus. They would form the nucleus of a mobile force that grew to include other infantry, cavalry, engineer, signal, and field artillery units, as well as a Marine battalion that had protected the Canal since 1904. Together these troops, under the control of the ICC, were known as the Panama Canal Guard.

Panama Canal Department
The Panama Canal Department was created as a separate command of the United States Army on 26 June 1917 by separation from the Eastern Department. The department was initially headquartered at Ancón, relocating to Quarry Heights on 1 April 1920. It was responsible for the defense of the Canal Zone, including land areas, coastal defenses, harbor defenses, air defenses, and sea defenses within medium bomber range. The department was also responsible for the laying, maintaining, and clearing of harbor defense minefields that were to be placed at the canal entrance in event of a war. In event of a war, it was to defend against landings at either end of the Canal, coordinating with forces of the United States Navy.

The department controlled the major land force in the Canal Zone, the Panama Canal Division, which was activated in 1921. The division included two infantry brigades: the 19th, responsible for the Atlantic side of the canal, and the 20th, responsible for the Pacific side. The department included a separate command, the Panama Coast Artillery District, which was to provide coast defense against seaborne invasion. The division was disbanded in 1932.

Later, the Panama Mobile Force was activated on 16 February 1940 by Panama Canal Department commander, Lieutenant General Daniel Van Voorhis in order to improve defense of the Panama Canal Zone. Four infantry and one engineer regiment, plus two artillery battalions were assigned to the Mobile Force, even after World War II began. The plan to defend the Canal Zone was to conduct a mobile defense in depth beginning at the beaches and not by preparing and holding static defense positions. The Atlantic side was considered the least likely invasion route because the few landing areas there were too small to allow the discharge of numerous forces simultaneously.

On 10 February 1941, the Caribbean Defense Command was established as a theater command responsible for tactical control of the Panama Canal and Puerto Rican Departments, as well as bases in the Caribbean, eventually taking control of air and naval forces as well. It was co-located with the department headquarters at Quarry Heights, under the command of the department commander. During World War II, the department reached its peak strength in January 1943, when 68,000 men were under its control. On 1 November 1947 it was replaced by United States Army Caribbean, part of the joint United States Caribbean Command.

Commanders 
The following officers are known to have commanded the department:
 Brigadier General Edward H. Plummer (July–August 1917)
 Brigadier General Adelbert Cronkhite (August 1917)
 Colonel George F. Landers (August–October 1917)
 Major General William S. Graves (October 1917–February 1918)
 Major General Richard M. Blatchford (February 1918–April 1919)
 Brigadier General Chase W. Kennedy (18 April 1919 – 23 May 1921)
 Brigadier General Edwin B. Babbitt (24 May–22 October 1931)
 Major General Samuel D. Sturgis Jr. (22 October 1921 – 19 September 1924)
 Major General William Lassiter (19 September 1924 – 10 October 1926)
 Major General Charles Martin (10 October 1926 – 1 October 1927)
 Major General William S. Graves (2 October 1927 – 1 April 1928)
 Major General Malin Craig (1 April 1928 – 10 August 1930)
 Major General George L. Irwin (10 August–24 November 1930)
 Major General Preston Brown (24 November 1930 – 4 September 1933)
 Major General Harold B. Fiske (5 September 1933 – 10 November 1935)
 Major General Lytle Brown (10 November 1935 – 29 July 1936)
 Major General Henry W. Butner (30 July 1936 – 10 February 1937)
 Brigadier General Frank W. Rowell (10 February–12 April 1937)
 Major General David L. Stone (12 April 1937 – 7 January 1940)
 Lieutenant General Daniel Van Voorhis (7 January 1940 – 17 September 1941)
 Lieutenant General Frank M. Andrews (17 September 1941 – 9 November 1942)
 Lieutenant General George H. Brett (November 1942–October 1945)
 Lieutenant General Willis D. Crittenberger (October 1945–November 1947)

See also
Naval Base Panama Canal Zone

References

Bibliography

Further reading 
  – 4 volumes
Military history of Panama
Departments and districts of the United States Army
Military units and formations established in 1917
Military units and formations disestablished in 1947
Military units and formations of the United States Army in World War II